The Kiev uezd was one of the subdivisions of the Kiev Governorate of the Russian Empire. It was situated in the eastern part of the governorate. Its administrative centre was Kiev.

Demographics
At the time of the Russian Empire Census of 1897, Kievsky Uyezd had a population of 541,483. Of these, 56.2% spoke Ukrainian, 26.6% Russian, 11.1% Yiddish, 3.4% Polish, 1.1% German, 0.8% Belarusian, 0.2% Czech, 0.2% Tatar, 0.1% Bashkir and 0.1% French as their native language.

References

 
Uezds of Kiev Governorate
1923 disestablishments in Ukraine